Dami Onadeko  (professionally known as DAMIDAMON (the don dada of music)) is a British-Nigerian recording artist, songwriter, and producer. After his break into the spotlight in 2012, for his singles London City and Summertime Love, Damidamon was nominated and won the "Music Artist of the Year" category at the 2013 Woolwich stars of tomorrow Awards UK.

Early life 
Damidamon started writing music before the age of 13. He credits he's starting so early to the passing of his grandmother whom he got a radio from and it was on this radio that he wrote his early songs (He was 11 at the time of her passing). He also credits his love for music to her as she indulged him whenever he was at her place by playing him different music and granting full access to music TV stations. His interest in music grew even wider which made him dive into producing around the age of 16. Producing some of his own releases and for other artists. Damidamon believes he has a place on the UK music scene and those who have heard his music agree.

Music career 
Damidamon first came on the scene in 2012 with his singles London City and Summertime Love getting some good response and plays on radio and Dj's in the south east of London. Damidamon was nominated and won the "Music Artist of the Year" category at the 2013 Woolwich stars of tomorrow Awards. Damidamon took a break from the music scene and returned with three singles in late 2018 ” Melinda Melinda ” ” Nah Miss Dem ” and ” WINE 4 ME ” and got some good reviews and created a buzz on the underground music scene, with several DJ's spinning his music.

2019 Warriors Heart - No Fear

Damidamon Goes Up North 
Damidamon moved up north to Newcastle UK and started his record label under his name D Onadeko Records where he has been releasing his music. In mid 2019, Damidamon released remixes of Barking by Ramz & Freaky Friday by Lil Dicky ft Chris Brown Titled "Kayla Kayla" & "Friday Night". This releases got his fans excited again and introduced him to the northern market earning him a nomination at the Newcastle Underground Talent 2019. In December 2019 Damidamon released his album " WARRIORS HEART - NO FEAR which had 8 tracks. Which has been a major success that has seen him performing all over the northern side of the UK.

1. Chat Dem A Chat ( WHNF MIXTAPE ) - Damidamon

2. Jumanji ( WHNF MIXTAPE ) - Damidamon

3. Christmas Time Is Here ( WHNF MIXTAPE ) - Damidamon

4. Rhythm & Whine ( WHNF MIXTAPE )

5. Monster ( WHNF MIXTAPE ) - Damidamon

6. Fine Girl Come Closer ( WHNF MIXTAPE ) - Damidamon

7. Jungle Fever ( WHNF MIXTAPE ) - Damidamon

8. Man Dem ( WHNF MIXTAPE ) - Damidamon

Awards

References 

 
 
 
 
 <
 
 
 
 

Living people
Afrobeat musicians
Musicians from Newcastle upon Tyne
21st-century Black British male singers
1990 births